Tim Gutberlet (born 23 August 1971) is a German former professional footballer who played as a midfielder. He made three appearances in the 2. Bundesliga for FC St. Pauli during his playing career.

References

External links 
 

1971 births
Living people
German footballers
Association football midfielders
2. Bundesliga players
Borussia Dortmund players
Borussia Dortmund II players
Arminia Bielefeld players
SV Darmstadt 98 players
Tennis Borussia Berlin players
FC Bayern Munich II players
FC St. Pauli players